Kamla Beniwal (born 12 January 1927) is an Indian politician. She was a senior member of Indian National Congress party. She served as a minister on different posts and Deputy Chief Minister during different time in Rajasthan. Later she served as Governor of different Indian states between 2009 and 2014. She became the first woman minister in Rajasthan in 1954 at the age of 27. She served as Deputy Chief Minister of Rajasthan in 2003. She also served as governor of Tripura (2009), Gujarat (2009-2014) and Mizoram (2014). She has been the first ever woman Governor of any northeastern state. She was awarded Tamrapatra by former prime minister Indira Gandhi in recognition of her contribution in the freedom struggle.

Political career 
After completing her education she joined Indian National Congress.

In 1954, at the age of 27, she won the Legislative Assembly election and became a minister in the Rajasthan state government. Beniwal has been a minister in successive Congress governments in Rajasthan since 1954, holding various important portfolios including home, medical and health, education and agriculture. She was the revenue minister in the Ashok Gehlot government.

For a decade, from 1980 to 1990, she was a cabinet minister in the Rajasthan government. During this time she held a sheer diversity of portfolios such as Agriculture, Animal husbandry, Irrigation, Labor and Employment, Education, Art and Culture, Tourism and Integrated Rural development.

In 1993 she was no longer a minister but still was elected to the Legislative Assembly from Bairath (now Viratnagar), Jaipur. She became a cabinet minister again in 1998, and was the Deputy Chief Minister of Rajasthan from 2003.

In her long career she has been closely associated with the functioning of the state Congress party and is a member of the All India Congress Committee. Among the party posts she has held as the joint secretary of the Pradesh Congress Committee during 1977 elections, member of the Rajasthan Congress Executive Committee, President of the Rajasthan Mahila Congress, member of the Rajasthan Pradesh Election Committee, and then the Chairman of the Election Campaign Committee.

Beniwal was a minister in the State Government of Rajasthan for an extensive period of time, holding different cabinet posts. As a minister, she has served the Rajasthan Government for nearly 50 years.

She was appointed Governor of Tripura in October 2009. She was the first female governor of any state of Northeast India. A month later, she was appointed the Governor of Gujarat on 27 November 2009 where she served for more than four years. On 6 July 2014, she was transferred to the post of Governor of Mizoram.

Various positions held 
Positions held for Indian National Congress
 Member – All India Congress Committee, New Delhi.
 Member – Rajasthan Pradesh Congress Committee.
 Member – Rajasthan Pradesh Election Committee (PEC).
 Member – Rajasthan Pradesh Congress Executive Committee, Jaipur.
 Member – Jaipur Rural District Congress Executive Committee.
 Chairman – Election Campaign Committee, Rajasthan.
 Joint Secretary – Rajasthan Pradesh Congress Committee from 1977–80.
 President – Rajasthan Pradesh Mahila Congress.
 Member – Pradesh Congress Sub-Committee for drafting message with respect to the letdowns of the Bharitiya Janata Party Government in Rajasthan.
 Convener – Rajasthan Pradesh Sadbhavna Yatra Publicity Sub-Committee.

Other posts
 Member of the Executive Committee of All India Panchayat.
 Chairperson – Rajasthan State Social Welfare Board and per se launched the projects for Women and Child Welfare in the state.
 Vice-President, S.O.S. Children Village, Jaipur.
 Executive Committee Member, Banasthali Vidhyapeeth, District Tonk, Rajasthan
 President, Rajasthan Sanskrit Sahitya Sammelan, Jaipur

Positions held in Co-operative Campaign after 1955;
Beniwal is one of the founder members of the Co-operative Movement and different important organisations in the state of Rajasthan. She held the following positions in these organisations:

 President of Rajasthan State Co-operative Union, Jaipur.
 General Secretary of Rajasthan State Co-operative Union, Jaipur.
 Member, General Body, Executive Committee, and Governing Council of National Co-operative Union of India, Khelgaon, New Delhi.
 Member, General Body and Executive Committee of All India Co-Operative Union, Jorbagh, New Delhi.
 Chairman, Women Co-operative Advisory Committee (NCUI), New Delhi.
 President, Co-Operative College Jaipur.
 Member, Women Committee of International Co-operative Alliance, London – UK.
 Member – Women Consultative Committee (NCUI) New Delhi.
 Member – Co-operative Training College (NCUI), Jaipur.

Achievements 
Other than being a quite senior member of the Indian National Congress, Beniwal is famous as a minister of good quality, honesty, and excellent performance. She had managed all the operations of her departments with comprehensive learning and diligence. She has lucid ideas about her task and was quite energetic to muster her officials to keep high standards of operation. As Agriculture Minister of the state, she was a key functionary in the setting up of Rajasthan Agriculture University in Bikaner.

As an Irrigation Minister, she completed the fabulous task of making district programmes of approximately 48,000 water harvesting plants in Rajasthan. As a result, a huge number of small, medium, and big projects are underway. This is certainly good news for farmers who suffer from drought.

She had a key role in setting up the National Institute of Ayurved, at Jaipur. With her firm endeavour, she has also set up a Sanskrit University at Jaipur.

Beniwal is one of the most committed and senior co-operators in India. She has served as the representative of the Rajasthan unit in National Co-operative Union of India in different ranks for nearly 20 years. As one of the limited and leading co-operators in India, Beniwal has been linked with the primary association of the All India Co-operative Union, Jorbagh, New Delhi, which is currently named as the National Co-operative Union of India (NCUI). From the very start of Co-operative Union, Beniwal was dynamically involved in the campaign to turn it into a real spokesperson establishment of the countrywide co-operative campaign. She received the Best Co-operator of India Award conferred by IFFCO in 1994 – 95.

Controversies

Appointment of Gujarat Lokayukta
The Lokayukta is a state-level body for monitoring the government, particularly for corruption. In August 2011, Beniwal appointed Justice R A Mehta as the Lokayukta. She did this under Section 3 of the Gujarat Lokayukta Act,
1986, which gives the governor the right to appoint Lokayukta without consulting the
government, when there has been a long delay in making the appointment. In so doing, Beniwal bypassed the Narendra Modi government of Gujarat, which had been sitting on the matter since 2004.

Justice Mehta had been recommended by the Chief Justice of the Gujarat High Court in June 2011, but the government did not act on the suggestion.  In August, the father of murdered RTI activist Amit Jethwa filed Public Interest Litigation in the High Court, which then served a show cause notice on the government for the delay in the appointment of the Lokayukta.  In response, the Gujarat state cabinet set up a committee of five ministers to look into the matter.

The unilateral action of the governor was challenged in the Gujarat High Court by the government of Gujarat. On 18 January 2012, the Lokyukta appointment was upheld by the court. The next day, the government of Gujarat further appealed to the Supreme Court by filing a special leave petition. On 2 January 2013, the Supreme Court too upheld the appointment, while noting that the Lokayukta post lying vacant for nine years reflected a "very sorry state of affairs". The bench said "the process of consultation by the Governor with the then Chief Justice stood complete, and in such a situation, the appointment of Justice Mehta cannot be held illegal". It noted that the Governor is bound to act under the advice of the Council of Ministers, but the appointment of Justice Mehta is right as it was done in consultation with the Chief Justice of the Gujarat High Court. It also observed that the Governor "has misjudged her role and has insisted that under the Lokayukta Act, the Council of Ministers has no role to play in the appointment of the Lokayukta". On 6 July 2014, Beniwal became governor of Mizoram.

References 

1927 births
Living people
Governors of Tripura
Women in Rajasthan politics
Rajasthani people
Governors of Gujarat
People from Jhunjhunu district
State cabinet ministers of Rajasthan
Women state governors of India
Governors of Mizoram
Deputy chief ministers of Rajasthan
Women in Tripura politics
Women in Gujarat politics
Women in Mizoram politics
20th-century Indian women politicians
20th-century Indian politicians
Indian National Congress politicians from Rajasthan
Indian women historians
20th-century Indian historians
Women scientists from Rajasthan
Women state cabinet ministers of India
21st-century Indian women scientists
21st-century Indian scientists
21st-century Indian women politicians
21st-century Indian politicians
Women deputy chief ministers of Indian states